These are the full results of the athletics competition at the 2001 Jeux de la Francophonie which took place on July 19–23, 2001, in Ottawa, Ontario, Canada.

Men's results

100 meters

Heats – July 20Wind:Heat 1: +0.3 m/s, Heat 2: 0.0 m/s, Heat 3: +0.5 m/s, Heat 4: +0.3 m/s, Heat 5: 0.0 m/s

Quarterfinals – July 20Wind:Heat 1: +0.2 m/s, Heat 2: +0.2 m/s, Heat 3: +0.6 m/s

Semifinals – July 21Wind:Heat 1: -0.2 m/s, Heat 2: +0.9 m/s

Final – July 21Wind: +0.7 m/s

200 meters

Heats – July 22Wind:Heat 1: +2.3 m/s, Heat 2: +2.3 m/s, Heat 3: +2.4 m/s, Heat 4: +3.0 m/s, Heat 5: +0.9 m/s

Semifinals – July 23Wind:Heat 1: +0.5 m/s, Heat 2: +2.1 m/s

Final – July 23Wind: +0.5 m/s

400 meters

Heats – July 19

Final – July 21

800 meters

Heats – July 19

Final – July 21

1500 meters

Heats – July 22

Final – July 23

5000 meters
July 20

10,000 meters
July 19

Marathon
July 22

110 meters hurdles

Heats – July 19Wind:Heat 1: -1.1 m/s, Heat 2: -1.0 m/s, Heat 3: -0.8 m/s

Final – July 20Wind:-0.1 m/s

400 meters hurdles

Heats – July 22

Final – July 23

3000 meters steeplechase
July 19

4 × 100 meters relay

Heats – July 22

Final – July 23

4 × 400 meters relay
July 23

20 kilometers walk
July 22

High jump
July 21

Pole vault
July 23

Long jump

Qualification – July 20

Final – July 22

Triple jump
July 23

Shot put
July 19

Discus throw
July 22

Hammer throw
July 23

Javelin throw
July 20

Decathlon
July 19–20

Women's results

100 meters

Heats – July 20Wind:Heat 1: +0.1 m/s, Heat 2: +0.3 m/s, Heat 3: +0.2 m/s, Heat 4: +0.1 m/s

Semifinals – July 21Wind:Heat 1: -0.1 m/s, Heat 2: +0.5 m/s

Final – July 21Wind: +0.5 m/s

200 meters

Heats – July 22Wind:Heat 1: +1.8 m/s, Heat 2: +2.9 m/s, Heat 3: +2.0 m/s

Final – July 23Wind:+0.5 m/s

400 meters

Heats – July 20

Final – July 21

800 meters

Heats – July 19

Final – July 21

1500 meters

Heats – July 22

Final – July 23

5000 meters
July 23

10,000 meters
July 20

Marathon
July 22

100 meters hurdles

Heats – July 19Wind:Heat 1: -1.6 m/s, Heat 2: -0.2 m/s

Final – July 20Wind:-0.5 m/s

400 meters hurdles

Heats – July 22

Final – July 23

4 × 100 meters relay
July 23

4 × 400 meters relay
July 23

10 kilometers walk
July 21

High jump
July 23

Pole vault
July 20

Long jump
July 21

Triple jump
July 21

Shot put
July 21

Discus throw
July 21

Hammer throw
July 22

Javelin throw
July 19

Heptathlon
July 22–23

References

Jeux de la Francophonie
2001